Florentino Bautista Jr. (born November 24, 1930 in Manila, Philippine Islands; died April 25, 2014 in Kawit, Cavite, Philippines) was a Filipino basketball player who competed in the 1952 Summer Olympics.

References

External links
 

1930 births
2014 deaths
Basketball players from Manila
Olympic basketball players of the Philippines
Basketball players at the 1952 Summer Olympics
Asian Games medalists in basketball
Basketball players at the 1954 Asian Games
Philippines men's national basketball team players
Filipino men's basketball players
Asian Games gold medalists for the Philippines
Medalists at the 1954 Asian Games
Letran Knights basketball players